Chestnut Township is one of twenty-one townships in Knox County, Illinois, United States. As of the 2010 census, its population was 253 and it contained 121 housing units.

Geography

Cities, towns, villages
 London Mills (northeast quarter)

Unincorporated towns
 Hermon at 
(This list is based on USGS data and may include former settlements.)

Extinct towns
 Bridgeport at 
 Burnside at 
(These towns are listed as "historical" by the USGS.)

Cemeteries
The township contains these four cemeteries: Elias Bragg, Harper, Hermon Christian and Hermon Methodist.

Airports and landing strips
 Davies Landing Strip

Demographics

School districts
 Abingdon Community Unit School District 217
 Knoxville Community Unit School District 202
 Spoon River Valley Community Unit School District 4

Political districts
 Illinois's 17th congressional district
 State House District 74
 State Senate District 37

References
 
 United States Census Bureau 2009 TIGER/Line Shapefiles
 United States National Atlas

External links
 City-Data.com
 Illinois State Archives
 Township Officials of Illinois

Townships in Knox County, Illinois
Galesburg, Illinois micropolitan area
Populated places established in 1852
Townships in Illinois
1852 establishments in Illinois